Three from the Vault is a live album by the Grateful Dead.  It contains the complete show recorded on February 19, 1971 at the Capitol Theatre in Port Chester, New York.  It was released on June 26, 2007.

The album was mastered from the 16-track concert soundboard tapes. Although the album was released in 2007, longtime Grateful Dead engineer Dan Healy actually mixed the album in 1993, and its release was delayed 14 years for unknown reasons.

The Capitol Theatre show

The February 19, 1971 Port Chester concert marked the beginning of Mickey Hart's temporary departure from the band.  The previous night's show would be his last with the Grateful Dead until his return on October 20, 1974.  The February 19 concert included the first live performances of the songs "Bird Song" and "Deal", and the second performances of "Loser", "Bertha", "Playing in the Band", "Greatest Story Ever Told", and "Wharf Rat".  The concert, which was on a Friday night, was the second of a series of six shows in seven days at the Capitol Theatre. All shows in the run were recorded on multitrack tapes, but this was the only one released until 2020, when the February 21 show was included on the Workingman's Dead 50th Anniversary Deluxe Edition in July 2020, and the February 18 show was included on the American Beauty 50th Anniversary Deluxe Edition in October 2020.

The opening act for this series of concerts, and for many other shows of that era, was the New Riders of the Purple Sage.  At that time the lineup of the New Riders featured Jerry Garcia of the Grateful Dead playing pedal steel guitar.  The band also included John Dawson, David Nelson, Dave Torbert, and Spencer Dryden.  Songs that they recorded at the February 21 and February 23, 1971 shows at the Capitol Theatre were released as an album called Vintage NRPS.

Other live Grateful Dead albums recorded in early to mid 1971 with the same band membership as on Three from the Vault are Skull and Roses, Ladies and Gentlemen... the Grateful Dead, Dick's Picks Volume 35, and Road Trips Volume 1 Number 3.

Track listing

Disc one
First set:
 "Two Ditties" — 1:19
"The Merry-Go-Round Broke Down" (Friend, Franklin)
"Spring Song" (Mendelssohn)
 "Truckin'" (Garcia, Lesh, Weir, Hunter) — 8:09
 "Loser" (Garcia, Hunter) — 6:23
 "Cumberland Blues" (Garcia, Lesh, Hunter) — 4:58
 "It Hurts Me Too" (Elmore James, Tampa Red) — 6:10
 "Bertha" (Garcia, Hunter) — 5:21
 "Playing in the Band" (Weir, Hart, Hunter) — 5:14
 "Dark Hollow" (Bill Browning) — 3:15
 "Smokestack Lightning" (Howlin' Wolf) — 14:42
 "China Cat Sunflower" (Garcia, Hunter) — 3:24 →
 "I Know You Rider" (traditional, arranged by Grateful Dead) — 7:02

Disc two
Second set:
 "Greatest Story Ever Told" (Weir, Hunter) — 4:22 →
 "Johnny B. Goode" (Chuck Berry) — 3:26
 "Bird Song" (Garcia, Hunter) — 7:04
 "Easy Wind" (Hunter) — 8:17
 "Deal" (Garcia, Hunter) — 4:22
 "That's it for the Other One" — 16:09 →
"Cryptical Envelopment" (Garcia)
"Drums" (Kreutzmann)
"The Other One" (Weir, Kreutzmann)
 "Wharf Rat" (Garcia, Hunter) — 9:08
 "Good Lovin'" (Artie Resnick, Rudy Clark) — 18:43
 "Casey Jones" (Garcia, Hunter) — 5:00

Credits

Grateful Dead

 Jerry Garcia - lead guitar, vocals
 Phil Lesh - bass, vocals
 Ron "Pigpen" McKernan – keyboards, harmonica, percussion, vocals
 Bill Kreutzmann - drums
 Bob Weir - rhythm guitar, vocals

Production

 Produced by Grateful Dead
 Recorded by Bob Matthews & Betty Cantor
 Mixed by Dan Healy
 Engineered by Jeffrey Norman & Don Pearson
 Mastering by Joe Gastwirt at Joe's Mastering Joint
 Tape Archivist: Dick Latvala
 Cover & Package Design: Steve Vance
 Photos by Fred Ordower (live), Bob Seidemann

Charts

References

Grateful Dead live albums
2007 live albums
Rhino Entertainment live albums